The Samastipur–Muzaffarpur section is a railway line connecting Samastipur to Muzaffarpur in the Indian state of Bihar. The  line passes through the plains of North Bihar and the Gangetic Plain in Bihar.

Electrification

Former Railway Minister Laloo Prasad Yadav announced for the electrification of the Barauni–Samastipur–Muzaffarpur–Hajipur line and Muzaffarpur–Gorakhpur line (via Hajipur, Raxaul and Sitamarhi) in the Rail Budget 2008. The electrification began in the year 2011 and was completed in 2014.

Stations

Speed limit
The Barauni–Samastipur–Muzaffarpur–Hajipur line is an B-Class line of Indian Railways. So maximum speed is restricted to 130 km/h.

Sidings and workshops
 Kanti Thermal Power Station, Muzaffarpur
 Bharat Wagon Engineering Limited, Muzaffarpur
 Major Freight Terminal at Narayanpur Anant
 Bharat Petroleum Siding, Narayanpur Anant
 FCI Siding at Narayanpur Anant
 100+ Diesel Locomotive Yard capacity at Samastipur
 Freight Terminal at Karpurigram railway station
 Workshop for wagon maintenance at Samastipur

See also
 Barauni–Gorakhpur, Raxaul and Jainagar lines
 Muzaffarpur–Hajipur section
 Barauni–Samastipur section
 
 
 East Central Railway zone

References

|

5 ft 6 in gauge railways in India
Railway lines in Bihar

Railway lines opened in 1886
Transport in Muzaffarpur
Transport in Samastipur